East Hill Cemetery is a historic cemetery and national historic district located in Rushville Township, Rush County, Indiana.  The cemetery was established in 1859 and contains about 14,000 burials.  Among the contributing resources are the Gothic Revival entrance arch, a public mausoleum (1935), Payne family mausoleum, Logan family mausoleum, Wilkison crypt, Havens monument, Willkie Memorial designed by sculptor Malvina Hoffman (1885–1966), and the Civil War Monument. The cemetery features numerous examples of high Victorian gravestone art featuring statuary and reliefs. Among the notable burials is Republican presidential candidate Wendell Willkie (1892–1944).

It was listed on the National Register of Historic Places in 2014.

References

External links
 

Historic districts on the National Register of Historic Places in Indiana
Cemeteries on the National Register of Historic Places in Indiana
1859 establishments in Indiana
Historic districts in Rush County, Indiana
National Register of Historic Places in Rush County, Indiana